Events from the year 1515 in France

Incumbents
 Monarch – Louis XII (until January 1), then Francis I

Events

1 January – Louis XII dies, and Francis I becomes the new King of France.

Births
 22 November – Mary of Guise, Queen of Scotland (died 1560 in Scotland)

Full date missing
Sebastian Castellio, preacher and theologian (died 1563 in the Swiss Confederacy)
Petrus Ramus, humanist (died 1572)
Nicolas Denisot, poet and painter (died 1559)

Deaths
1 January – Louis XII, King of France (born 1462)

Full date missing
Jacques Almain, professor of theology

See also

References

1510s in France